Rhabinopteryx is a genus of moths of the family Noctuidae.

Species
 Rhabinopteryx subtilis (Mabille, 1888)
 Rhabinopteryx turanica (Erschoff, 1874)

References
Natural History Museum Lepidoptera genus database
Rhabinopteryx at funet

Hadeninae